Sir Alan Smith, CBE, DFC*, DL (14 March 19171 March 2013), was a British World War II Royal Air Force Supermarine Spitfire fighter ace and businessman.

Early life
Smith was born at South Shields, County Durham. He left Bede College School, Sunderland at 14 after the death of his merchant navy sea captain father to work in his mother's ironmongery store and then set up his own business.

Military service
He trained as a pilot after joining the RAF Volunteer Reserve and joined No. 610 Squadron RAF. He then joined No. 616 Squadron RAF as a sergeant pilot in January 1941 based at RAF Tangmere. He was under the command of Wing Commander Douglas Bader who selected him as his wingman in which role he was described as "leech-like", and "a perfect number two". Two further well-known individuals made up Bader's section of four aircraft during this period: Johnnie Johnson and 'Cocky' Dundas. His appointment as wing man followed Douglas Bader's entry into the dispersal hut when he was told "Right you'll do. God help you if you let any Hun get on my tail". The section operated under the callsign 'Dogsbody' which originated from Douglas Bader's initials: "DB". Three of the four (Bader, Dundas and Smith) went on to receive knighthoods and all four survived the war.  On 9 August 1941 Smith had a head cold and hence was grounded on medical orders. As he was about to be commissioned he headed to London to be fitted for his new uniform. He was therefore unavailable to fly and protect his CO's tail and Bader was shot down and spent the remainder of the war as a PoW.

Smith then served as an instructor and trained Americans to fly the Spitfire. He joined No. 93 Squadron RAF and took part in Operation Torch flying from Algeria and he shot down four Focke-Wulf Fw 190 fighters and other aircraft. After service as a flying instructor in Florida he left the RAF in December 1945 as a Flight Lieutenant having clocked up over 1500 flying hours.

Career
Smith then moved to Scotland where he became a managing director and then a chief executive in the textile industry.  He also served as Chairman of Quayle Munro, merchant bank, in Edinburgh.

Honours and decorations
He was appointed CBE in 1976 and was knighted in 1982.

On 4 November 1941, the then Pilot Officer Alan Smith, Royal Air Force Volunteer Reserve, No. 616 Squadron is awarded the Distinguished Flying Cross in recognition of gallantry displayed in flying operations against the enemy:

On 16 February 1943, Flight Lieutenant Alan Smith DFC, Royal Air Force Reserve, No. 93 Squadron is awarded a Bar to the Distinguished Flying Cross in recognition of gallantry displayed in flying operations against the enemy:

On 1 January 1976, as chairman of Dawson International, he was appointed a Commander of the Order of the British Empire (CBE) in the new year honours. On 12 June 1982, he was appointed a Knight Batchelor as chairman and chief executive of Dawson International in the Queen's Birthday Honours.

References

Royal Air Force officers
British World War II flying aces
People from South Shields
Recipients of the Distinguished Flying Cross (United Kingdom)
Knights Bachelor
English aviators
English chief executives
Commanders of the Order of the British Empire
Deputy Lieutenants in Scotland
1917 births
2013 deaths
Royal Air Force Volunteer Reserve personnel of World War II
20th-century English businesspeople